Howell Homeplace, also known as the William Brinkley Howell Homeplace, is a historic home located near Tarboro, Edgecombe County, North Carolina. The frame dwelling dates to the mid-19th century, and is a two-story cubicle house sheathed in weatherboard with a hipped roof. The vernacular Greek Revival interior features extraordinary painted decoration in the entrance and stairhalls.  The decoration is attributed to Edward Zoeller, a Bavarian fresco painter, who also decorated the Redmond-Shackelford House. Also on the property is a contributing outbuilding.

It was listed on the National Register of Historic Places in 1984.

References

Houses on the National Register of Historic Places in North Carolina
Greek Revival houses in North Carolina
Houses in Edgecombe County, North Carolina
National Register of Historic Places in Edgecombe County, North Carolina